Adriano Bolzoni (14 April 1919 – 2003) was an Italian journalist, writer and film director.

Life and career 
Born in Cremona, Bolzoni started his career as a journalist, being war correspondent from the front of World War II. Later, he became director of Reporter, a right-wing weekly magazine published between 1959 and 1960 which is best remembered for having Pier Paolo Pasolini as film critic.  In the 1960s he became editor of the newspaper Corriere della Sera.

Bolzoni entered the cinema industry in 1948, collaborating at the screenplay of the adventure film I contrabbandieri del mare, directed by Roberto Bianchi Montero; later he was a prolific screenwriter, arousing some fame with several successful Spaghetti Westerns and poliziotteschi. He was also an occasional director of films and documentaries and an essayist.

Partial filmography
 I'm the Capataz (1951)
 Minnesota Clay (1964) Screenwriter
 Savage Gringo (1966) Screenwriter
 Avenger X (1967) Story

References

Footnotes

Sources

External links 
 

1919 births
Writers from Cremona
Italian film directors
20th-century Italian screenwriters
Italian male journalists
2003 deaths
Italian war correspondents
War correspondents of World War II
Italian male screenwriters
20th-century Italian journalists
Mass media people from Cremona
20th-century Italian male writers